Tellinoidea is a taxonomic superfamily of saltwater clams, marine bivalve molluscs in the order Cardiida.

Families
These families are assigned to Tellinoidea:
Donacidae Fleming, 1828
Psammobiidae Fleming, 1828
Semelidae Stoliczka, 1870 (1825)
Solecurtidae d'Orbigny, 1846
Tellinidae Blainville, 1814

References

Venerida
Mollusc superfamilies